There are at least 42 named lakes and reservoirs in Mineral County, Montana.

Lakes
 Bonanza Lakes, el. 
 Bouchard Lake, el. 
 Cedar Log Lakes, el. 
 Clear Lake, el. 
 Cliff Lake, el. 
 Copper Lake, el. 
 Crater Lake, el. 
 Mineral County, el. 
 Dalton Lake, el. 
 Deep Creek Lake, el. 
 Diamond Lake, el. 
 French Lake, el. 
 Gold Lake, el. 
 Hazel Lake, el. 
 Heart Lake, el. 
 Heart Lake, el. 
 Heart Lake, el. 
 Hidden Lake, el. 
 Hidden Lake, el. 
 Hoodoo Lake, el. 
 Hub Lake, el. 
 Lenora Lake, el. 
 Lost Lake, el. 
 Mary Lake, el. 
 Missoula Lake, el. 
 Moore Lake, el. 
 Mud Lake, el. 
 Oregon Lakes, el. 
 Pearl Lake, el. 
 Rudie Lake, el. 
 Saint Regis Lake, el. 
 Siamese Lakes, el. 
 Silver Lake, el. 
 Square Lake, el. 
 Straight Lake, el. 
 Surveyor Lake, el. 
 Trail Lake, el. 
 Trio Lakes, el. 
 Twomile Pond, el. 
 Upper Saint Regis Lake, el. 
 Wilson Lake, el. 
 Windfall Lake, el.

Reservoirs

See also
 List of lakes in Montana

Notes

Bodies of water of Mineral County, Montana
Mineral